Cycling Team Kranj is a Slovenian UCI Continental cycling team which rejoined the Continental rank in 2022. It originated from the amateur Kolesarski klub Kranj (Sava), which was founded in 1957.

Former riders include current UCI WorldTour Professionals Matej Mohorič and Luka Mezgec as well as former Professionals; Tadej Valjavec and Grega Bole.

Team roster

Major wins 

2005
 Time Trial Championships, Hans-Peter Obwaller
2006
Stage 1 The Paths of King Nikola, Grega Bole
Stage 2 Okolo Slovenska, Grega Bole
2007
 Time Trial Championships, Kristijan Koren
Stage 1 Istrian Spring Trophy, Grega Bole
Stage 2 The Paths of King Nikola, Vladimir Kerkez
Stage 1 Giro della Regione Friuli Venezia Giulia, Grega Bole
Stage 4 Giro della Regione Friuli Venezia Giulia, Vladimir Kerkez
2008
Poreč Trophy, Aldo Ino Ilešič
Belgrade–Banja Luka I, Aldo Ino Ilešič
Stage 1 Giro della Regione Friuli Venezia Giulia, Uroš Silar
Stage 2 Grand Prix Cycliste de Gemenc, Gašper Švab
2009
Stage 2 The Paths of King Nikola, Vladimir Kerkez
Stage 3 The Paths of King Nikola, Matej Stare
GP Kranj, Gašper Švab
GP P-Nivo, Uroš Silar
2010
Stage 1 Istrian Spring Trophy, Blaž Furdi
Gran Premio Palio del Recioto, Blaž Furdi
Banja Luka–Beograd I, Jure Zrimšek
2011
Stage 1 Istrian Spring Trophy, Luka Mezgec
Memoriał Henryka Łasaka, Luka Mezgec
2012
Stage 5 Five Rings of Moscow, Luka Mezgec
Stages 2, 4, 6, 11 & 13 Tour of Qinghai Lake, Luka Mezgec
2013
Stage 4 Rhône-Alpes Isère Tour, Mark Džamastagič
Trofeo Città di San Vendemiano, Mark Džamastagič
Stage 1b Okolo Slovenska, Tim Mikelj
2015
Grand Prix Sarajevo, Gašper Katrašnik
2022
  Under-23 National Time trial, Luka Turkulov

National champions
2022
  Under-23 National Time trial, Luka Turkulov

References

External links

UCI Continental Teams (Europe)
Cycling teams established in 2004
Cycling teams based in Slovenia
2004 establishments in Slovenia